Epiglaea apiata, the pointed sallow moth or cranberry blossom worm, is a moth of the family Noctuidae. It is found in North America, where it has been recorded from Florida, Georgia, Indiana, Louisiana, Maine, Maryland, Michigan, Minnesota, New Brunswick, North Carolina, Ohio, Quebec, South Carolina and Wisconsin.

The wingspan is about 34 mm. The forewings are tawny to light dull leather. Some specimens exhibit a faint rosy or purplish hue. There is a dark brown form that is mainly found in the northern United States and Canada. Adults have been recorded on wing from August to March, with most records in September and October.

The larvae feed on Oxycoccus and Cyanococcus species.

References

Cuculliinae
Moths described in 1874
Cranberries